Zieria littoralis, commonly known as dwarf zieria is a plant in the citrus family Rutaceae and is endemic to south-eastern Australia. It is an erect or spreading shrub with velvety, three-part, clover-like leaves and clusters of up to thirty white or pale pink flowers with four petals and four stamens. It grows on exposed, rocky coastal headlands.

Description
Its branches are covered with velvety hairs, at least when young. Both surfaces of the leaflets are warty and covered with velvety hairs but the upper surface is a darker green than the lower one. The edges of the leaflets are rolled under. The flowers are arranged in clusters of between three and thirty in leaf axils, the clusters usually shorter than the leaves. There are four stamens. Flowering occurs from winter to early summer and is followed by fruit which are hairy capsules.

Taxonomy and naming
Zieria littoralis was first formally described in 2002 by James Armstrong from a specimen collected near the Green Cape lighthouse and the description was published in Australian Systematic Botany. The specific epithet (littoralis) is a Latin word meaning "of the seashore".

Distribution and habitat
This zieria grows on exposed, rocky coastal headlands south from Tathra in New South Wales, on the far north east coast of Victoria, on Gabo Island and on the central east coast of Tasmania.

References

External links
 

littoralis
Sapindales of Australia
Flora of New South Wales
Flora of Victoria (Australia)
Flora of Tasmania
Plants described in 2002